The Prince Albert Mountains are a major mountain group in Antarctica over 320 km (200 mi) long.  Located in Victoria Land, they run north–south between the Priestley and Ferrar glaciers.

They were named for Prince Albert, the consort of the British Queen Victoria.  Although they were discovered by Sir James Clark Ross on February 17, 1841, they were not first explored until the early 1900s, when British cartographers came.  They were mapped and surveyed carefully by explorers from the United States and New Zealand in the 1950s and 1960s.

Major peaks 

This range include the following mountains:

Other features 
Other features or groups of features in the Prince Albert Mountains have been named by various survey groups and expeditions.

Sheppard Rocks is a group of rocks first mapped by United States Geological Survey (USGS) from surveys and U.S. Navy air photos, 1956–62. Named by Advisory Committee on Antarctic Names (US-ACAN) for Paul D. Sheppard, storekeeper with the South Pole Station winter party in 1966. They lie 4 miles (6 km) northwest of Ricker Hills.

Ricker Hills is a group of mainly ice-free hills, about 9 nautical miles (17 km) long, lying just west of Hollingsworth Glacier and 4 nautical miles (7 km) north of Bobby Rocks. They were mapped and named by the Southern Party of the New Zealand Geological Survey Antarctic Expedition (NZGSAE), 1962–63, for J.F. Ricker, a geologist with the party.

Like the Sheppard Rocks, they were mapped by the USGS from surveys and air photos, 1956–62. They were named by US-ACAN for Bobby J. Davis, a commissaryman with the South Pole Station winter party, 1966.

See also
Dogwatch Saddle

References

External links

Australian Antarctic Data Centre

 
Transantarctic Mountains
Mountain ranges of Oates Land
Mountain ranges of Victoria Land
Scott Coast